Ricardo Trigilli (August 24, 1934, Buenos Aires, Argentina - January 21, 2010, Buenos Aires, Argentina) was an Argentine football player. He played for clubs in Argentina and Chile.

Teams
  Argentinos Juniors 1952-1958
  Vélez Sarsfield 1959-1960
  Universidad Católica 1961-1962
  Deportes La Serena 1963
  Ferrobádminton 1964
  San Telmo 1965

Titles
 Argentinos Juniors 1955 (Argentine Second División Championship)
 Universidad Católica 1961 (Chilean Primera División Championship)

References

1934 births
2010 deaths
Argentine footballers
Argentine expatriate footballers
Club Deportivo Universidad Católica footballers
Argentinos Juniors footballers
Club Atlético Vélez Sarsfield footballers
Deportes La Serena footballers
Chilean Primera División players
Argentine Primera División players
Expatriate footballers in Chile
Estudiantes de Buenos Aires managers
Talleres de Remedios de Escalada managers
Association footballers not categorized by position
Footballers from Buenos Aires
Club Atlético Colón managers